Grant's leaf-toed gecko (Hemidactylus granti) is a species of gecko, a lizard in the family Gekkonidae. The species is endemic to Socotra.

Usually it can be found camouflaging at rocky areas, for example cliffs, and mountain peaks.

Etymology
The specific name, granti, is in honor of Scottish ornithologist William Robert Ogilvie-Grant.

Reproduction
H. granti is oviparous.

References

Further reading
Boulenger GA (1899). "The Expedition to Sokotra: II. Descriptions of the New Species of Reptiles". Bulletin of the Liverpool Museums 2: 4–7. (Hemidactylus granti, new species, p. 4).

Hemidactylus
Endemic fauna of Socotra
Reptiles of the Middle East
Reptiles described in 1899
Taxa named by George Albert Boulenger